Thadlaskein Lake, also Pung Sajar Nangli, is man-made historical Lake in Meghalaya, India. It is located beside National Highway 6 by the side of a small village called Mukhla village which falls under West Jaintia Hills district Jowai.

According to a tale about the existence of this lake is related to a young leader of the medieval time named Sajar Nangli and his followers who once gathered together at a certain location to rest after their long day's journey. They began digging the ground on which they were sitting and resting upon with their bows and arrows edges and eventually it soon turned into a beautiful lake which is famous till today one of a huge lake in Meghalaya. Therefore, Thadlaskein Lake was named after his legacy.

The lake is a popular picnic spot. The lake was regarded as a sacred lake which is being revered by the people of Raid Mukhla who continued to offer sacrifices near the Lake and also was worshiped by a belonging community called Niamtre (a tribal religion in Meghalaya). The sacrifices was made once in a hundred years and was practiced by the Lyngdoh (a local indigenous priest) of the Niamtre community.

References

Further reading 

 Lamare, Shobhan N. (2005). The Jaintias: Studies in Society and Change.
Folktales are Stories to give Meaning to Natural Phenomenon
Hinduism and Nature

Lakes of Meghalaya